Maurice Lim (born 1984) is a Dutch figure skater who was a two-time champion of the Dutch Figure Skating Championships.

He won his first championships at the age of 14 and Alexei Mishin's considered him one of the top talents of his time. At that time he declared to have no interest in pursuing figure skating seriously. Instead he followed his father's career and in 2010 started a dentistry practice in Ridderkerk.

Results

References

External links
results

1984 births
Living people
Dutch male single skaters
Sportspeople from Ridderkerk